This is the discography for the American musician and session guitarist Tim Pierce, whose career spans more than four decades (2022).

 Acuérdate de Mí – Bertín Osborne (1974)
 Shandi – Shandi (1980)
 Harvest of Dreams – Bobb Trimble (1982)
 Ignition – John Waite (1982)
 "Runaway" – Bon Jovi (1982)
 Success Hasn't Spoiled Me Yet – Rick Springfield (1982)
 The Key – Joan Armatrading (1983)
 Living in Oz – Rick Springfield (1983)
 Tane Cain – Tane Cain (1983)
 Born & Raised (On Rock & Roll) – Beau Coup (1984)
 Bon Jovi – Bon Jovi (1984)
 Hard to Hold – Rick Springfield (1984)
 Vox Humana – Kenny Loggins (1985)
 Nature of the Beast – Maureen Steele (1985)
 Beat of the Drum – Rick Springfield (1985)
 Tao – Rick Springfield (1985)
 Crowded House – Crowded House (1986)
 Hands Across the Night – Ian Messenger (1986)
 Peter Case – Peter Case (1986)
 Heaven on Earth – Belinda Carlisle (1987)
 After Here Through Midland – Cock Robin (1987)
 I'm Only Fooling Myself – Eric Martin (1987)
 Back to Avalon – Kenny Loggins (1988)
 The Reckoning – Margaret Becker (1988)
 Rock of Life – Rick Springfield (1988)
 Notes from the Lost Civilization – Tonio K. (1988)
 Witness – Witness (1988)
 Heart Like a Gun – Fiona_(singer) (1989)
 One in a Million – Hiroko (1989)
 Can't Fight the Midnight – Jimmy Harnen (1989)
 Tim Finn – Tim Finn (1989)
 Tangled – Jane Wiedlin (1990)
 Brickyard Road – Johnny Van Zant (1990)
 A View from 3rd Street – Jude Cole (1990)
 Delusions of Grandeur – Kevin Raleigh (1990)
 Show Off – Lori Ruso (1990)
 I'm Breathless [Music from and Inspired by the Film Dick Tracy] – Madonna (1990)
 Balince: A Collection – Marty Balin (1990)
 Promesa De Amor – Ruly Aguirre (1990)
 Shortstop – Sara Hickman (1990)
 The Party – The Party (1990)
 Life Goes On – Tommy Puett (1990)
 Toy Matinee – Toy Matinee (1990)
 Arachnophobia [Original Soundtrack] –  (1990)
 Bitterblue – Bonnie Tyler (1991)
 Anonymous Confessions of a Lunatic Friend – Bryan Duncan (1991)
 Too Tired to Sleep – Dirk Hamilton (1991)
 Leap of Faith – Kenny Loggins (1991)
 House of Hope – Toni Childs (1991)
 Vagabond Heart – Rod Stewart (1991)
 Dangerous – Michael Jackson (1991)
 Nicky Holland – Nicky Holland (1991)
 Truly Blessed – Teddy Pendergrass (1991)
 In the Meantime, In Between Time – The Party (1991)
 Love Talk – The Stylistics (1991)
 The Williams Brothers – The Williams Brothers (1991)
 Simply the Best – Tina Turner (1991)
 Will T. Massey – Will T. Massey (1991)
 All I Want for Christmas [Soundtrack] –  (1991)
 World Falling Down – Peter Cetera (1992)
 Tiny Toon Adventures – Tiny Toons Sing (1992)
 Amused to Death – Roger Waters (1992)
 Rendez-vous – Christopher Cross (1992)
 Patty Smyth – Patty Smyth (1992)
 Human Touch – Bruce Springsteen (1992)
 The Power of One – Hans Zimmer (1992)
 Demons Down – House of Lords (1992)
 Pop Top – Jim Basnight (1992)
 Latin Street '92 – José Feliciano (1992)
 Start the Car – Jude Cole (1992)
 América & en Vivo – Luis Miguel (1992)
 A Different Man – Peter Kingsbery (1992)
 Treasures, Vol. 1 – Petula Clark (1992)
 Songs for My Best Friends – The Baby-Sitters Club (1992)
 A Very Special Christmas 2 –  (1992)
 Attitude & Virtue – Corey Hart (1992)
 The Vanishing Race – Air Supply (1993)
 Real – Belinda Carlisle (1993)
 Vivir Una Vez – Brizuela (1993)
 Symphony or Damn – Terence Trent D'Arby (1993)
 The Colour of My Love – Céline Dion (1993)
 In Every Small Town – Clouseau (1993)
 Tuesdays Are Forever – D.D. Wood (1993)
 Donna De Lory – Donna De Lory (1993)
 A Buen Puerto – Eva Santa Maria (1993)
 Painted Desert Serenade – Joshua Kadison (1993)
 Bat Out of Hell II: Back into Hell – Meat Loaf (1993)
 Reach out to Me – Michael Damian (1993)
 Rumble Doll – Patti Scialfa (1993)
 Robert Vaughn & the Dead River Angels – Robert Vaughn (1993)
 Robin Zander – Robin Zander (1993)
 Do You Love Me Like You Say? – Terence Trent D'Arby (1993)
 What's Love Got to Do with It – Tina Turner (1993)
 Captain of the Ship – Tsuyoshi Nagabuchi (1993)
 Queen of the Night - Whitney Houston (1993)
 Meanwhile – 3rd Matinee (1994)
 Pasiones – Ednita Nazario (1994)
 Always – Freddy Cole (1994)
 Gems – Patti LaBelle (1994)
 Have a Little Faith – Joe Cocker (1994)
 In the Hot Seat – Emerson, Lake & Palmer (1994)
 Street Angel – Stevie Nicks (1994)
 Angels on the Faultline – Keith Chagall (1994)
 Santo Cachon – Los Embajadores Vallenatos (1994)
 Siempre Contigo – Lucero (1994)
 Mirando Hacia El Sur – Luis Angel (1994)
 Care of My Soul – Mark Spiro (1994)
 Mujeres – Marta Sánchez (1994)
 Time of the Season – Michael Damian (1994)
 Seo Taiji and Boys III - Seo Taiji and Boys (1994)
 Amanda Marshall – Amanda Marshall (1995)
 A Spanner in the Works – Rod Stewart (1995)
 If My Heart Had Wings – Melissa Manchester (1995)
 Am I Still in Your Heart – Chuck Negron (1995)
 Temple Bar – John Waite (1995)
 I Believe in Love Again – Lori Ruso (1995)
 Welcome to the Neighbourhood – Meat Loaf (1995)
 HIStory: Past, Present and Future, Book I – Michael Jackson (1995)
 A Medio Vivir – Ricky Martin (1995)
 Navidad, Tu y Yo – The Barrio Boyzz (1995)
 New Wave – The Challengers (1995)
 Don't Ask – Tina Arena (1995)
 Playback – Tom Petty / Tom Petty & the Heartbreakers (1995)
 The Mighty Morphin Power Rangers [Original Soundtrack] –  (1995)
 The Message – 4Him (1996)
 Amanda Marshall – Amanda Marshall (1996)
 Vivencias – Ana Gabriel (1996)
 Falling into You – Céline Dion (1996)
 Wildest Dreams – Tina Turner (1996)
 Off the Beaten Path – Dave Koz (1996)
 Well – David Grow (1996)
 Someone Who Cares – David Robertson (1996)
 Qué Será De Mí – Flavio Cesar (1996)
 France – France Gall (1996)
 Back Room Blood – Gerry Goffin (1996)
 Somewhere Under Heaven – Jamie Slocum (1996)
 Feels So Good – Lina Santiago (1996)
 Now Is Then, Then Is Now – Mark Spiro (1996)
 Amigos – Paul Anka (1996)
 Lost in Reality – Player (1996)
 Kissing Rain – Roch Voisine (1996)
 If We Fall in Love Tonight – Rod Stewart (1996)
 The Hypocrite – Ryan Downe (1996)
 25 de Diciembre – Simone (1996)
 Back to the World – Tevin Campbell (1996)
 The Unimaginable Life – Kenny Loggins (1997)
 Freedom – Sheena Easton (1997)
 Let's Talk About Love – Céline Dion (1997)
 Dans ma chair – Patricia Kaas (1997)
 Ride – Jamie Walters (1997)
 Across from Midnight – Joe Cocker (1997)
 Bathhouse Betty – Bette Midler (1998)
 Naked Without You – Taylor Dayne (1998)
 No Ordinary World – Joe Cocker (1999)
 Telling Stories – Tracy Chapman (2000)
 Bette – Bette Midler (2000)
 Ronan – Ronan Keating (2000)
 Inside Job – Don Henley (2000)
 Scream If You Wanna Go Faster – Geri Halliwell (2001)
 You Don't Wanna – Tricky (2001)
 Laundry Service – Shakira (2001)
 Trouble in Shangri-La – Stevie Nicks (2001)
 Destination – Ronan Keating (2002)
 (2) – Olivia Newton-John (2002)
 Respect Yourself – Joe Cocker (2002)
 Cry – Faith Hill (2002)
 Testify - Phil Collins (2002) 
 All About Love – Steven Curtis Chapman (2003)
 Seal – Seal (2003)
 One Heart – Céline Dion (2003)
 Thankful – Kelly Clarkson (2003)
 Anastacia – Anastacia (2004)
 Blue Skies – Diana DeGarmo (2004)
 Stronger Than Before – Olivia Newton-John (2005)
 The Moment – Lisa Stansfield (2005)
 Marcas de Ayer – Adriana Mezzadri (2005)
 Polvo de Estrellas – Alberto Plaza (2005)
 Into the Rush – Aly & AJ (2005)
 Pieces of a Dream – Anastacia (2005)
 100 – Andy Stochansky (2005)
 See the Sun – Black Lab (2005)
 Covering the Bases – Bronson Arroyo (2005)
 Crowded House/Temple of Low Men – Crowded House (2005)
 Second First Impression – Daniel Bedingfield (2005)
 Hurricane – Eric Benét (2005)
 Hope 7 – Hope 7 (2005)
 Unpredictable – Jamie Foxx (2005)
 Red Rocks Platinum – John Tesh (2005)
 RENT [Original Motion Picture Soundtrack] – Jonathan Larson (2005)
 Feel the Spirit – Nã Leo Pilimehana (2005)
 Unwritten – Natasha Bedingfield (2005)
 Prince of Darkness – Ozzy Osbourne (2005)
 Ronan Keating – Ronan Keating (2005)
 All That I Am – Santana (2005)
 Sissi Enamorada – Sissi (2005)
 Spin – Steve Cole (2005)
 Susie Suh – Susie Suh (2005)
 Dancing on Tables Barefoot – Tara Blaise (2005)
 Buoni O Cattvi – Vasco Rossi (2005)
 PopJazz – Warren Hill (2005)
 Beautiful to Be Alive – Zoë Scott (2005)
 The Christmas Album – Michael Damian (2005)
 Mind How You Go – Skye Edwards (2006)
 Awake – Josh Groban (2006)
 Right Where You Want Me – Jesse McCartney (2006)
 Goodbye Alice in Wonderland – Jewel (2006)
 Love Is My Religion – Ziggy Marley (2006)
 Still the Same... Great Rock Classics of Our Time – Rod Stewart (2006)
 Acoustic Hearts of Winter – Aly & AJ (2006)
 Soundtrack to Your Life – Ashley Parker Angel (2006)
 Chronicles – Bon Jovi (2006)
 Siren – Breanna Lynn (2006)
 An Other Cup – Cat Stevens / Yusuf (2006)
 Le Miroir – Chimène Badi (2006)
 Stripped – Christina Aguilera (2006)
 The Shabbat Lounge – Craig Taubman (2006)
 One People – Debbie Friedman (2006)
 Let Love In – Goo Goo Dolls (2006)
 Closer to the Sun – Guy Sebastian (2006)
 Huecco – Huecco (2006)
 Something About You, Pt. 1 – Jamelia (2006)
 Walk with Me – Jamelia (2006)
 Only One Too – Jewel (2006)
 Gold – Joe Cocker (2006)
 So This Is It – Kim Dexter (2006)
 Io Canto – Laura Pausini (2006)
 Maria Lawson – Maria Lawson (2006)
 Fundamental – Pet Shop Boys (2006)
 I Care – Rachelle Ann Go (2006)
 We Are the '80s – Rick Springfield (2006)
 Royalush – Royalush (2006)
 Becoming – Sarah Geronimo (2006)
 Tightrope – Stephanie McIntosh (2006)
 Midnight Rendezvous – Steve Madaio (2006)
 The Secret Life Of... – The Veronicas (2006)
 Bird on a Wire – Toby Lightman (2006)
 I Will – Tracy Lyons (2006)
 V – Vanessa Hudgens (2006)
 Aura – Yvonne Catterfeld (2006)
 Fly – Zucchero (2006)
 Ho: A Dan Band Christmas – The Dan Band (2006)
 Christmas Pop –  (2006)
 East of Angel Town – Peter Cincotti (2007)
 Life in Cartoon Motion – Mika (2007)
 The Best Damn Thing – Avril Lavigne (2007)
 Beowulf [Music from the Motion Picture] – Alan Silvestri (2007)
 Insomniatic – Aly & AJ (2007)
 Motown: A Journey Through Hitsville USA – Boyz II Men (2007)
 Where I've Always Been – Brock Hillman (2007)
 Top Dog – Buck McCoy (2007)
 Por Capricho – Claudia Brant (2007)
 Set the Mood – David Jordan (2007)
 La Mujer Que Hay en Mí – Diana Mor (2007)
 Caterpillar – Elisa (2007)
 E2 – Eros Ramazzotti (2007)
 Closer to the Sun/The Memphis Album – Guy Sebastian (2007)
 Piece of Magic – Hannah Lindroth (2007)
 Hannah Montana 2: Meet Miley Cyrus – Hannah Montana (2007)
 Something About You – Jamelia (2007)
 Treasure Planet [Original Motion Picture Score] – James Newton Howard (2007)
 Human – Jeff Austin Black (2007)
 Jessica Callahan – Jessica Callahan (2007)
 Indiana – Jon McLaughlin (2007)
 Jonas Brothers – Jonas Brothers (2007
 Behind These Eyes – Justin Lanning (2007)
 We Are One – Kelly Sweet (2007)
 Based on a True Story – Kimberley Locke (2007)
 Bloodsport [Original Motion Picture Soundtrack] – Paul Hertzog (2007)
 Famous – Puddle of Mudd (2007)
 Obsession – Rachelle Ann Go (2007)
 Wines & Spirits – Rahsaan Patterson (2007)
 Bee Movie [Music from the Motion Picture] – Rupert Gregson-Williams (2007)
 Ultimate Santana – Santana (2007)
 Ultra Payloaded – Satellite Party (2007)
 Nouvelle Vague – Sylvie Vartan (2007)
 TCG – The Cheetah Girls (2007)
 Hersey Sensin – Yalin (2007)
 Give US Your Poor –  (2007)
 Jazz Club: Jazz for the Road –  (2007)
 Moondance Alexander –  (2007)
 P.S. I Love You [Original Motion Picture Soundtrack] –  (2007)
 Teen Witch: The Musical –  (2007)
 In the Swing of Christmas – Barry Manilow (2007)
 Let's Talk About Love/Celine Dion – Céline Dion (2008)
 Gavin DeGraw – Gavin DeGraw (2008)
 I Came Around – Amie Miriello (2008)
 The Greatest Songs of the Eighties – Barry Manilow (2008)
 Coming to Terms – Carolina Liar (2008)
 Uncle Charlie – Charlie Wilson (2008)
 David Archuleta – David Archuleta (2008)
 David Cook – David Cook (2008)
 Don't Forget – Demi Lovato (2008)
 Pass It Around – Donavon Frankenreiter (2008)
 Echo Jet – Echo Jet (2008)
 Dancing – Elisa (2008)
 Assalto – Huecco (2008)
 Crazy Love – Jackie Bristow (2008)
 Evolver – John Legend (2008)
 OK Now – Jon McLaughlin (2008)
 Break the Silence – Jon Peter Lewis (2008)
 Permission To Fly – Jordan Pruitt (2008)
 I Choose You – Laura Wight (2008)
 Monglong – Lee Seung Hwan (2008)
 Il Diario di Lola – Lola Ponce (2008)
 In Precious Age – Mari Hamada (2008)
 I'll Be the One – Mark Bautista (2008)
 King of Pop – Michael Jackson (2008)
 Heat – Michael Lington (2008)
 Breakout – Miley Cyrus (2008)
 Natalia Lesz – Natalia Lesz (2008)
 Deeper Life/Stronger – Natalie Grant (2008)
 Natalie Grant Collector's Edition – Natalie Grant (2008)
 Whiskey Mornings – Pat Dailey (2008)
 East of Angel Town – Peter Cincotti (2008)
 Holding on to Love – Raquel Aurilia (2008)
 Step Outside – Saith (2008)
 The Sound of Madness – Shinedown (2008)
 The Archies Christmas Party – The Archies (2008)
 The Spirit of Christmas [Collector's Edition] – The Spirit Of Christmas (2008)
 Three Graces – Three Graces (2008)
 Tina! – Tina Turner (2008)
 Cradlesong – Rob Thomas (2009)
 The Boy Who Knew Too Much – Mika (2009)
 Safe and Sound - Kyosuke Himuro featuring Gerard Way (2009)
 The Ugly Truth [Original Motion Picture Soundtrack] – Aaron Zigman (2009)
 For Your Entertainment – Adam Lambert (2009)
 BHB – Ballas Hough Band (2009)
 Moving Forward – Bernie Williams (2009)
 Streelight Lullabies – Brandon White (2009)
 Let's Talk About Love/A New Day Has Come – Céline Dion (2009)
 Mr. Lucky – Chris Isaak (2009)
 Breakthrough – Colbie Caillat (2009)
 Big Whiskey & the GrooGrux King – Dave Matthews / Dave Matthews Band (2009)
 My Kind of Christmas – Dean Martin (2009)
 Gloriana – Gloriana (2009)
 2012 [Original Score] – Harald Kloser / Thomas Wander (2009)
 Kate Pazakis Unzipped: Live at the Zipper – Kate Pazakis (2009)
 Kris Allen – Kris Allen (2009)
 Rock On – Michael Damian (2009)
 Vivir Así – Mijares (2009)
 Uno No Es Uno – Noel Schajris (2009)
 Kiss & Tell – Selena Gomez / Selena Gomez & the Scene (2009)
 Tri-Polar – Sick Puppies (2009)
 Happy Hour – Uncle Kracker (2009)
 A Very Special Christmas 7 –  (2009)
 Hard Knocks – Joe Cocker (2010)
 Some Kind of Trouble – James Blunt (2010)
 We've All Been There – Alex Band (2010)
 The Greatest Love Songs of All Time – Barry Manilow (2010)
 Tour Box – Bon Jovi (2010)
 Brendan James – Brendan James (2010)
 A Thousand Different Ways/Measure of a Man – Clay Aiken (2010)
 Best of Me – Daniel Powter (2010)
 Shoot for the Stars – Dwight Howard (2010)
 Jason Castro – Jason Castro (2010)
 Supernatural, Seasons 1-5 [Original Television Soundtrack] – Jay Gruska / Christopher Lennertz (2010)
 Rage and Ruin – Jimmy Barnes (2010)
 Hang Cool Teddy Bear – Meat Loaf (2010)
 Can't Be Tamed – Miley Cyrus (2010)
 Born Again – Newsboys (2010)
 Pull – Mr. Mister (2010)
 Out of My Chelle – Rachelle Spector (2010)
 Nothing Like This – Rascal Flatts (2010)
 Someday – Rob Thomas (2010)
 11:59 – Ryan Star (2010)
 Guitar Heaven: The Greatest Guitar Classics of All Time – Santana (2010)
 A Year Without Rain – Selena Gomez / Selena Gomez & the Scene (2010)
 Page One – Steven Page (2010)
 Sinner or a Saint – Tamar Kaprelian (2010)
 The Band Perry – The Band Perry (2010)
 World Gone Crazy – The Doobie Brothers (2010)
 What's Love Got To Do with It/Foreign Affair – Tina Turner (2010)
 Radio the World – TruWorship (2010)
 Songs from the Playhouse – TruWorship (2010)
 Happy Hour: The South River Road Sessions – Uncle Kracker (2010)
 Inusual – Yuri (2010)
 From the Heart: Coffee House Edition –  (2010)
 Christmas Is the Time to Say I Love You – Katharine McPhee (2010)
 Il Volo – Il Volo (2011)
 Ghost on the Canvas – Glen Campbell (2011)
 Happen Again – Andy Kim (2011)
 15 Minutes (FAME... Can You Take It?) – Barry Manilow (2011)
 The Essential Céline Dion – Céline Dion (2011)
 All of You – Colbie Caillat (2011)
 One Day – David Burnham (2011)
 This Loud Morning – David Cook (2011)
 Rock the Tabla – Hossam Ramzy (2011)
 People and Things – Jack's Mannequin (2011)
 Marconi – Marconi (2011)
 Matthew Morrison – Matthew Morrison (2011)
 Believe – Nick Swisher (2011)
 Negociaré Con La Pena – Pepe Aguilar (2011)
 Formula, Vol. 1 – Romeo Santos (2011)
 American Idol Season 10 Highlights – Scotty McCreery (2011)
 Clear as Day – Scotty McCreery (2011)
 When the Sun Goes Down – Selena Gomez / Selena Gomez & the Scene (2011)
 Vivere o Niente – Vasco Rossi (2011)
 Ximena Sariñana – Ximena Sariñana (2011)
 American Idol: 10th Anniversary: The Hits, Vol. 1 –  (2011)
 A Very Special Christmas, Vols. 1-2 –  (2011)
 Fire It Up – Joe Cocker (2012)
 Havoc and Bright Lights – Alanis Morissette (2012)
 Turn On the Lights – Daniel Powter (2012)
 Fires – Ronan Keating (2012)
 It's a Man's World – Anastacia (2012)
 Somos – Eros Ramazzotti (2012)
 A Thousand Miles Left Behind – Gloriana (2012)
 Love Is a Four Letter Word – Jason Mraz (2012)
 Born to Die – Lana Del Rey (2012)
 Paradise – Lana Del Rey (2012)
 Into the Wild: Live at Eastwest Studios – LP (2012)
 Electra Heart – Marina and the Diamonds (2012)
 Vladivostok – Mumiy Troll (2012)
 Nathan Pacheco – Nathan Pacheco (2012)
 Songs for the End of the World – Rick Springfield (2012)
 Amaryllis – Shinedown (2012)
 The Crossing – Sophie B. Hawkins (2012)
 Habítame Siempre – Thalía (2012)
 Lead with Your Heart – The Tenors (2012)
 100 Year Anniversary of Fenway Park –  (2012)
 Rock of Ages [Original Motion Picture Soundtrack] –  (2012)
 Ultimate Christmas Collection – Chicago (2012)
 Christmas in the Sand – Colbie Caillat (2012)
 All That Echoes – Josh Groban (2013)
 Head on a String – Adam Jensen (2013)
 Hazard of the Die – Andy Palmer (2013)
 Dos Orillas – Antonio Orozco (2013)
 The Fight – Curtis Peoples (2013)
 Baptized – Daughtry (2013)
 What a Life – Erin Boheme (2013)
 Magnetic – Goo Goo Dolls (2013)
 Proof of Life – Scott Stapp (2013)
 Connect – Sick Puppies (2013)
 Heartthrob – Tegan and Sara (2013)
 Melody Road – Neil Diamond (2014)
 R-Kive – Genesis (2014)
 Rester Vivant – Johnny Hallyday (2014)
 Forever for Now – LP (2014)
 A Life Worth Living – Marc Broussard (2014)
 Rewind – Rascal Flatts (2014)
 Exotica – Roxanna (2014)
 Corazón – Santana (2014)
 For You – Selena Gomez (2014)
 Smokey & Friends – Smokey Robinson (2014)
 Love Songs – Tina Turner (2014)
 The Organisation of Pop: 30 Years of Zang Tuum Tumb –  (2014)
 One Christmas: Chapter One – LeAnn Rimes (2014)
 The Great Unknown – Rob Thomas (2015)
 Piece by Piece – Kelly Clarkson (2015)
 A Gift of Love – Bette Midler (2015)
 After It All – Delta Rae (2015)
 I'll Be Me [Original Soundtrack] – Glen Campbell (2015)
 El Amor – Gloria Trevi (2015)
 Grande Amore – Il Volo (2015)
 Fountain and Vine – Sara Niemietz (2015)
 Revival – Selena Gomez (2015)
 All-American Boy – Steve Grand (2015)
 School of Rock: The Musical [Original Broadway Cast] –  (2015)
 Encore: Movie Partners Sing Broadway – Barbra Streisand (2016)
 Encore un soir – Céline Dion (2016)
 Constellation – Chris Mann (2016)
 Playlist – Geri Halliwell (2016)
 Eccomi – Patty Pravo (2016)
 Rocket Science – Rick Springfield (2016)
 Rita Wilson – Rita Wilson (2016)
 Black Cat – Zucchero (2016)
 Acoustic Christmas – Neil Diamond (2016)
 Unleash the Love – Mike Love (2017)
 Inside a Dream – Echosmith (2017)
 Rainbow – Kesha (2017)
 Songs of Cinema – Michael Bolton (2017)
 Travel Light – Sara Niemietz (2017)
 An Echosmith Christmas – Echosmith (2017)
 Safe in The Arms of Mine – Rita Coolidge (2018)
 Bridges – Josh Groban (2018)
 Walls – Barbra Streisand (2018)
 Immortal – Ann Wilson (2018)
 Bye Bye – Annalisa (2018)
 Pete The Cat – Pete The Cat (2018)
 The Snake King – Rick Springfield (2018)
 Traces – Steve Perry (2018)
 Icarus Falls – ZAYN (2018)
 Motown Magic [Original Soundtrack] –  (2018)
 War in My Mind – Beth Hart (2019)
 Musica – Il Volo (2019)
 Ascend – Illenium (2019)
 Echo – Keiko Matsui (2019)

Discographies of American artists